Red, White & Royal Blue is a 2019 LGBT romance novel by Casey McQuiston. The novel centres around the character of Alex Claremont-Diaz, the First Son of the United States, and his romantic relationship with Prince Henry, a British prince.

Background
McQuiston first came up with the idea for what would become Red, White & Royal Blue during the 2016 American presidential elections. While watching a season of the HBO comedy series Veep and reading both a Hillary Clinton biography by Carl Bernstein, A Woman in Charge: The Life of Hillary Rodham Clinton, and The Royal We by Heather Cocks and Jessica Morgan, they found themself intrigued by the extravagant, high-profile lifestyle of the royals and wanted to write their own take on a story featuring a royal family.

Plot
Alex Claremont-Diaz is the son of America's first female president, who is getting ready to run for re-election in 2020. After an incident at a royal wedding, Alex has to pretend to be friends with Britain's Prince Henry, to prevent it becoming a full-blown diplomatic and media crisis that would distract from his mother's election bid. While the effort is initially to control the damage, the two actually do become friends. They eventually become romantically involved when Henry reveals he is gay and Alex realizes he is bisexual. They have to reconcile this with their positions on the world stage, while trying not to endanger his mother's re-election.

Characters

Main characters
Alex Claremont-Diaz is the First Son of the United States and the brother of June Claremont-Diaz. The book is written from his perspective.
Henry Fox-Mountchristen-Windsor is a British prince and third in line to the British throne.
June Claremont-Diaz is the First Daughter of the United States and the sister of Alex Claremont-Diaz.
Ellen Claremont is the first female President of the United States. A Democrat from Texas, she is the mother of Alex and June Claremont-Diaz and the ex-wife of Oscar Diaz.
Zahra Bankston is the Deputy Chief of Staff for Ellen Claremont.
Nora Holleran is the granddaughter of Vice-President Mike Holleran. Along with Alex and June Claremont-Diaz, she makes up the 'White House Trio'.
Percy 'Pez' Okonjo is the best friend of Prince Henry. He is the founder of several charities and non-profit organizations.
Beatrice Fox-Mountchristen-Windsor is the older sister of Prince Henry and the younger sister of Prince Philip. She is a recovering cocaine addict, an addiction which was developed after her father's death. She is the fourth in line for the throne.

Minor characters
Amy Chen is a Secret Service agent and security detail to the First Family. She is trans and married to an unnamed woman.
Cassius (also referred to as 'Cash') is another security detail to the First Family. He is pansexual.
Oscar Diaz is a Senator from California, the father of Alex and June Claremont-Diaz, and the ex-husband of Ellen Claremont.
Mike Holleran is Ellen Claremont's vice-president. He is the grandfather of Nora Holleran.
Leo is the second husband of Ellen Claremont, First Gentleman of the United States, and the step-father to June and Alex Claremont-Diaz.
Rafael Luna is a young Independent Senator from Colorado. He is Latino and openly gay. Alex Claremont campaigned on Luna's campaign and the two are close friends.
Jeffery Richards is the far-right Republican nominated to face Ellen Claremont in the 2020 election.
Shaan Srivastava is an equerry to Prince Henry. During the course of the book he gets engaged to Zahra Bankston.

Reception
The novel gained generally positive reviews, especially for its representation of a gay relationship. Kirkus Reviews said that "McQuiston's strength is in dialogue" and their "rich, well-drawn characters" and Publishers Weekly called Red, White & Royal Blue an "extremely promising start". The Nerd Daily said the novel was "an absolute gem" and praised McQuiston's "exquisite care" in creating their characters, awarding it a ten out of ten. The Hoya also reviewed the novel positively, noting its "distinctive millennial humor" and the "spectacular supporting characters". It was noted, however, that the plot was not necessarily realistic.

The novel was included in the New York Times Bestseller List in June 2019. McQuiston said they were "blown away" by the response to the novel and have discussed the potential for a sequel. Red, White & Royal Blue won a 2020 Alex Award and the 2019 Goodreads Choice Awards for Best Romance and Best Debut.

Swedish Netflix television series Young Royals was compared to Red, White & Royal Blue due to the similarity of some of the plot points.

Adaptation 

In April 2019, it was reported that Amazon Studios had won an auction to the film rights of Red, White & Royal Blue, which would be produced by Berlanti Productions. In October 2021, it was announced that playwright and screenwriter Matthew Lopez will be directing the movie.

In June 2022, Taylor Zakhar Perez and Nicholas Galitzine were announced as the movie's leads, playing Alex Claremont-Diaz and Prince Henry respectively. Uma Thurman was confirmed to play Ellen Claremont. Clifton Collins Jr., Stephen Fry, Sarah Shahi, Rachel Hilson, Ellie Bamber, Aneesh Sheth, Polo Morín, Ahmed Elhaj and Akshay Khanna were also announced to be joining the cast. Production is set to begin in the UK in the same month.

In July 2022, Sharon D. Clarke, Malcom Atobrah, and Thomas Flynn were announced to be joining the cast. Thomas Flynn is set to play Prince Philip. The lead actors confirmed on Instagram that primary production had completed by 15 August 2022.

References

2019 debut novels
2019 American novels
2019 LGBT-related literary works
2010s LGBT novels
Gay male teen fiction
Gay male romance novels
Novels with bisexual themes
Novels with transgender themes
Novels about elections
Novels about royalty
Books about United Kingdom royalty
American LGBT novels
St. Martin's Press books
American romance novels